The 2013 season was Aalesund's 7th consecutive year in Tippeligaen, and their first season with Jan Jönsson as the club's manager. Aalesund competed in the Tippeligaen, finishing 4th, and the cup where they reached the third Round, losing to Ranheim of the Adeccoligaen.

Squad

Transfers

Winter

In:

Out:

Summer

In:

Out:

Competitions

Tippeligaen

Results summary

Results by round

Results

Table

Norwegian Cup

Squad statistics

Appearances and goals

|-
|colspan="14"|Players away from Aalesund on loan:
|-
|colspan="14"|Players who left Aalesund during the season:

|}

Goal scorers

Disciplinary record

Notes

References

Aalesunds FK seasons
Aalesund